Abbey Hill School and College is a special secondary school in Stoke-on-Trent, Staffordshire, England. According to DfES, it has been awarded specialist status as a SEN and Arts College.

The school
The school comprises an upper school, a lower school and a special autistic school for challenged children. Upper school students must take on community service as part of their education. Age ranges from preschool to eighteen years for the students.

Autistic School
Since autistic children require a very structured environment, the school has set aside half of the schools for smaller, individual classes. Age ranges from preschool to sixteen years for the students.

References
https://web.archive.org/web/20060421074940/http://www.abbeyhill.stoke.sch.uk/unit.htm

Special secondary schools in England
Special schools in Stoke-on-Trent
Foundation schools in Stoke-on-Trent
Specialist arts colleges in England
Specialist SEN colleges in England